The Bragoto River is a river in southern Chad. It is a tributary of the Chari River.

The bridge spanning Chad's Bragoto River had collapsed, forcing farmers in the region of Koumogo to travel 127 km to market their produce in Sarh, as opposed to 63 km using the bridge. It was rebuilt with special self-help funds by the Koumogo Village Association.

External links
Bridge Rebuilt in Southern Chad

Rivers of Chad